Płosków may refer to the following places:
Płosków, Greater Poland Voivodeship (west-central Poland)
Płosków, Kuyavian-Pomeranian Voivodeship (north-central Poland)
Płosków, Masovian Voivodeship (east-central Poland)